Blue Record is the second studio album by American heavy metal band Baroness, released on 13 October 2009. It is considered the sister album to the previous album, Red Album. This is the first album to feature Pete Adams on guitar. Blue Record debuted at number 1 on the Billboard Heatseekers chart, and was named Decibel number 1 record of 2009. In 2013, Blue Record was named the 20th Greatest Metal Album in History by LA Weekly.

Blue Record is the last Baroness album to feature bassist Summer Welch.

Track listing

Personnel
 John Dyer Baizley – lead vocals, rhythm guitar, piano, artwork
 Allen Blickle – drums
 Pete Adams – lead guitar, backing vocals
 Summer Welch – bass

References

2009 albums
Baroness (band) albums
Relapse Records albums
Albums produced by John Congleton
Albums with cover art by John Dyer Baizley